Antun Škvorčević (born 8 May 1947) is a Croatian bishop, leader of the Roman Catholic Diocese of Požega.

Early life and education
Antun Škvorčević was born in a small village of Davor on 8 May 1947 to Ivan and Ljubičica Škvorčević.

He enrolled in primary school in Davor, and Zagreb, eventually graduating in Slavonski Brod, after which he attended high school (Classical catholic gymnasium) for future priests on Šalata in Zagreb. Škvorčević graduated from Zagreb Catholic Theological Faculty, where he also gained his master's degree, after which he went to Rome for additional specialization. In 1981 he gained his doctorate in theology at the Pontifical Gregorian University. In addition, he graduated liturgy from the Pontifical Institute of Sacred Liturgy.

Career
Antun Škvorčević was ordered for a priest of the Archdiocese of Zagreb on June 25, 1972. After ordination, he worked as a chaplain in the parish of St. Joseph in Zagreb (1972-1976), lecturer at the Zagreb Catholic Theological Faculty and its institutes (since 1982), Head of the Catechetical Institute of Catholic Theology of the University of Zagreb (1991-1999), and member of the Quorum prebendarian main church in Zagreb (appointed in 1987).

on May 3, 1992, Pope John Paul II. appointed him titular bishop of Editania and auxiliary bishop of the Roman Catholic Diocese of Đakovo-Srijem or Bosna. He was ordained a bishop on July 16 of the same year in the cathedral in Đakovo. 

On July 5, 1997, Pope John Paul II appointed him Bishop of, at the time, newly founded Diocese of Požega. And he was enthroned  on September 27, 1997.

References

External links

1947 births
Living people
Roman Catholic bishops in Croatia
Croatian theologians
People from Davor, Croatia
University of Zagreb alumni
Pontifical Gregorian University alumni